The 22nd Michigan Infantry Regiment was an infantry regiment that served in the Union Army during the American Civil War.

Service

Former Governor of Michigan Moses Wisner worked to raise the 22nd Michigan Infantry and was commissioned as its colonel. The new regiment was mustered into Federal service at Pontiac, Michigan, on August 29, 1862. Among its ranks was Henry W. Howgate, who after the war became a controversial figure as the Chief Disbursing Officer for the United States Army Signal Corps in charge of Arctic explorations. Another notable member was John Clem, also known as the Drummer Boy of Chickamauga and Johnny Shiloh, the youngest non-commissioned officer ever to serve in the U.S. Military and the last Civil War veteran still on active duty at the time of his retirement.

In September 1862, Wisner was stricken with typhoid fever while en route to the regiment's deployment and died in Kentucky.

The 22nd Michigan Infantry was mustered out of service on June 26, 1865.

Total strength and casualties
The regiment suffered 3 officers and 86 enlisted men who were killed in action or mortally wounded and 4 officers and 306 enlisted men who died of disease, for a total of 399 
fatalities.

Commanders
 Colonel Moses Wisner
 Colonel Heber Le Favour

See also
List of Michigan Civil War Units
Michigan in the American Civil War

Notes

References
The Civil War Archive

Units and formations of the Union Army from Michigan
1865 disestablishments in Michigan
1862 establishments in Michigan
Military units and formations established in 1862
Military units and formations disestablished in 1865